Buais is a former commune in the Manche department in Normandy in northwestern France. On 1 January 2016, it was merged into the new commune of Buais-les-Monts.

Location
Buais is a small village southeast of Saint-Hilaire-du-Harcouët.

Population

Amenities
It has a bakery, bar/post office, corner shop, hairdresser, taxi office, and veterinarian.

See also
Communes of the Manche department

References

Former communes of Manche